Thomas Franklin Corcoran (July 13, 1943 – January 16, 2023) was an American writer of mystery novels. Based in Florida, he also authored three books on classic Ford Mustangs. 

Corcoran was friends with Jimmy Buffett and shot photographs for seven of Buffett's album covers, as well as co-wrote the hits "Fins" and "Cuban Crime of Passion".

Corcoran died from cancer in Lakeland, Florida, on January 16, 2023, at the age of 79.

Selected bibliography
Shelby Mustang (1992) 
The Mango Opera (1998)
Gumbo Limbo (1999)
Bone Island Mambo (2001)
Ultimate Muscle (2002) 
Octopus Alibi (2003)
Air Dance Iguana (2005) 
Jimmy Buffett-The Key West Years (2006)
Hawk Channel Chase (2009)
The Quick Adiós (Times Six) (2012)
Triple in Paradise (2012)
Crime Almost Pays (2015) 
Guava Moon Revenge (2018) 
The Cayo Hueso Maze (2020)

External links
Tom Corcoran's official homepage

References

1943 births
2023 deaths
20th-century American male writers
20th-century American novelists
21st-century American male writers
21st-century American novelists
American male novelists
American mystery writers
Novelists from Florida